Rush is a 2013 biographical sports film centred on the rivalry between two Formula One drivers, the Briton, James Hunt and the Austrian, Niki Lauda during the 1976 motor-racing season. It was written by Peter Morgan, directed by Ron Howard and starred Chris Hemsworth as Hunt and Daniel Brühl as Lauda. The film premiered in London on 2 September 2013 and was shown at the 2013 Toronto International Film Festival before its United Kingdom release on 13 September 2013. The film received positive reviews from critics for Hemsworth and Brühl's performances, Howard's direction, the racing sequences, and Hans Zimmer's musical score.

Plot 
James Hunt, a brash and self-confident individual, and Niki Lauda, a cool and calculating technical genius who relies on practice and precision, are exceptional racing car drivers who first develop a fierce rivalry in 1970 at a Formula Three race in London, when both their cars spin before Hunt wins the race. Lauda takes a large bank loan from Austria's Raiffeisen Bank to buy his way into the BRM Formula One team, meeting teammate Clay Regazzoni for the first time. 

Meanwhile, Hesketh Racing, the fledgling racing team Hunt drives for, enters Formula One. Lauda then joins Scuderia Ferrari with Regazzoni and wins his first championship in 1975. Hesketh closes down after failing to secure a sponsor, but Hunt joins the McLaren team. During this time, Hunt marries supermodel Suzy Miller, while Lauda develops a relationship with German socialite Marlene Knaus.

The 1976 season starts with Lauda dominating the first two races while Hunt struggles to catch up. Hunt wins the Spanish Grand Prix, but is disqualified after a post-race inspection results in a ruling that the width of his car was greater than permitted. Struggling to comply with F1 rules, McLaren suffers a series of racing setbacks, and Hunt's situation is further exacerbated when Suzy starts a relationship with actor Richard Burton. 

Following his divorce, Hunt regains his competitive spirit and, when his disqualification in Spain is overturned, the restored points put him into championship contention. Lauda marries Marlene in a private ceremony but begins to have concerns about the effects of his newfound happiness, worrying that he has become vulnerable as a racer, as he now has something to lose.

On the day of the German Grand Prix, Lauda calls a drivers' meeting, urging the F1 committee to cancel the race due to heavy rain on the notoriously dangerous Nürburgring Nordschleife; the vote goes against cancellation after Hunt argues that Lauda is trying to personally benefit in competition by reducing the number of remaining races at a time where Lauda already has a significant points lead towards the season's championship. 

Most drivers start the race with wet weather tyres, which becomes a costly tactic due to most of the track quickly drying. They all change tyres during the second lap, pushing Hunt ahead of Lauda; the latter's attempts to catch up result in a suspension arm in his Ferrari breaking, causing a loss of control and crash of the car into an embankment, where it bursts into flames. Lauda is airlifted to hospital with third-degree burns to his head and face and internal burns to his lungs. For six weeks, Lauda is treated for his injuries while he watches Hunt dominate the races in his absence. Despite his doctor's orders, he decides to return to drive his Ferrari at the Italian Grand Prix, finishing fourth while Hunt fails to finish.

The 1976 season comes to a climax at the rain-soaked Japanese Grand Prix. Hunt's late rally in Lauda's absence has pulled him within three points of Lauda. At the end of the second lap, after his car has slid several times, Lauda returns to the pits and decides to retire from the race, considering it too dangerous and opting to stay with Marlene instead. This allows Hunt to win the championship if he can finish third or better. After facing stiff competition under gruelling conditions, tyre problems and a hand injury due to the gear shifter knob breaking, Hunt finishes third, winning the championship by a single point.

Hunt spends the rest of the year revelling with fame, sex and drugs, while Lauda takes an interest in flying private planes. At a private airfield in Bologna, Lauda suggests to Hunt that he focus on the next racing season to defend his title, but Hunt argues that his glamorous lifestyle is the highlight of being world champion; furthermore, Lauda later realises that Hunt no longer feels he needs to prove himself to anyone. Hunt continues to race until his retirement in 1979, and becomes a motorsport broadcast commentator until his death in 1993 at the age of 45.

Lauda reflects on how their great rivalry and personality differences spurred each other on to their finest achievements, and states that Hunt was the only person he ever envied.

Cast

 Chris Hemsworth as James Hunt, a British F1 driver who races for McLaren
 Daniel Brühl as Niki Lauda, an Austrian F1 driver and Hunt's main rival who races for Scuderia Ferrari
 Olivia Wilde as Suzy Miller, Hunt's wife
 Alexandra Maria Lara as Marlene Lauda, Niki Lauda's wife
 Pierfrancesco Favino as Clay Regazzoni, Niki Lauda's teammate
 David Calder as Louis Stanley, chairman of BRM 
 Natalie Dormer as Nurse Gemma, a nurse who checks Hunt's injuries and is one of Hunt's girlfriends
 Stephen Mangan as Alastair Caldwell
 Christian McKay as Lord Hesketh
 Alistair Petrie as Stirling Moss 
 Colin Stinton as Teddy Mayer
 Julian Rhind-Tutt as Anthony 'Bubbles' Horsley

Hunt and Lauda appear as themselves, in the 1970s and 1980s, in archive footage at the end of the film, while Lauda is then seen for a few seconds in contemporary (2013) footage.

Production
The film was shot on location in the United Kingdom, Germany and Austria. Blackbushe Airport in Hampshire, the Snetterton (Norfolk), Cadwell Park (Lincolnshire), the former Crystal Palace and Brands Hatch (Kent) motor racing circuits in Britain, and at the Nürburgring in Germany. Both vintage racing cars and replicas were used in the filming.

The financiers include Hürth-based action concept Film- und Stuntproduktion, Egoli Tossell Film, Revolution Films (GB) and Cross Creek Pictures (US). The Film- und Medienstiftung NRW funded the film with €1.35 million, additional funding was provided by MFG Filmförderung Baden-Württemberg and the German Federal Film Fund (DFFF).

Director Ron Howard originally intended for Russell Crowe to make a cameo appearance as Richard Burton for a brief scene where he confronts James Hunt on his affair with Suzy.

Historical accuracy
Some things in the film are exaggerated (like the Hunt–Lauda rivalry; in reality they had shared a flat early in their careers and were good friends), others downplayed (like Lauda's wife's shock at his disfigurement), and others invented (like Hunt beating up a reporter or the Nürburgring nickname being "the graveyard"; in fact Jackie Stewart had nicknamed it "the Green Hell"). Other inaccuracies include the British F3 battle at Crystal Palace, which in reality was between Hunt and Dave Morgan, and Hunt's overtake on Regazzoni for 3rd place in the Japanese Grand Prix when in the actual race he passed Alan Jones. Another error in the Japanese Grand Prix is that Regazzoni and Laffite finished fourth and fifth, while in the actual race it was Jones and Regazzoni who finished fourth and fifth. In the end scene an incident is described where Hunt, while being a TV broadcaster, comes to a meet-up with Lauda on a bicycle with a flat tire. In reality this incident happened while Hunt ran out of money and fell into alcohol addiction. On this day Lauda gave him money to rebuild his life. Hunt, after Lauda gave him money a second time, fixed his life and got a job as a television broadcaster.

The culmination of the 1975 Championship is depicted, 38 minutes into the picture, as occurring at the US Grand Prix. Lauda is shown in a wheel-to-wheel dice with Hunt’s Hesketh 308B. In reality, the title was decided in Lauda’s favour at the previous race, in Italy, and the two drivers were never together on track at Watkins Glen. Lauda won that race from start to finish, whilst Hunt trailed in fourth, driving the new Hesketh 308C.

Soundtrack

The film's orchestral score was composed by Hans Zimmer. The soundtrack includes 1970s rock music by Dave Edmunds, Steve Winwood (originally performed and written by the Spencer Davis Group), Mud, Thin Lizzy and David Bowie.

Marketing
BBC Two aired the documentary Hunt vs. Lauda: F1's Greatest Racing Rivals, on 14 July 2013. The documentary provides an extensive look at the rivalry between Hunt and Lauda, featuring interviews with Lauda and former crew members of the McLaren and Ferrari teams.

The Ferrari & the Cinema Society jointly organised a screening of the film at Chelsea Clearview Cinemas in New York on 18 September 2013. Chris Hemsworth attended the screening.

Reception

Box office
Rush was a box office success. It earned $26.9 million in domestic box office and $71.3 million in international box office for a worldwide gross of $98.2 million against an estimated budget of $38 million.

Critical reception
On review aggregator website Rotten Tomatoes, the film holds an approval rating of 88% based on 238 reviews with an average rating of 7.5/10. The website’s critical consensus reads, "A sleek, slick, well-oiled machine, Rush is a finely crafted sports drama with exhilarating race sequences and strong performances from Chris Hemsworth and Daniel Brühl." Another review aggregator, Metacritic, which assigns a normalised rating to reviews, calculated an average score of 74 out of 100, based on 43 critics, indicating "generally favorable reviews". Audiences polled by CinemaScore gave the film an average grade of "A-" on an A+ to F scale.

When Niki Lauda first saw the pre-screening of the unedited footage, he considered himself to be portrayed too negatively. This changed on the day of the first screening when Bernie Ecclestone told him how much he liked it. Lauda was pleased with the overall look of the film. He was quoted as saying: "When I saw it the first time I was impressed. There was no Hollywood changes or things changed a little bit Hollywood-like. It is very accurate. And this really surprised me very positively".

Home media
Rush was released on DVD and Blu-ray on 28 January 2014. A Sainsbury's exclusive edition with a bonus disc of new special features was released for a limited time. The Australian Blu-ray release is bundled with the 2013 documentary 1.

Accolades

See also
Hunt–Lauda rivalry

Notes

References

External links

 

2013 films
2013 biographical drama films
2013 drama films
2010s sports drama films
British auto racing films
British biographical drama films
British sports drama films
British nonlinear narrative films
American biographical drama films
American nonlinear narrative films
American auto racing films
BAFTA winners (films)
Biographical action films
Biographical films about sportspeople
Cultural depictions of racing drivers
Cultural depictions of Austrian men
Cultural depictions of British men
Cross Creek Pictures films
English-language German films
Exclusive Media films
Films produced by Brian Grazer
Films produced by Brian Oliver
Films produced by Eric Fellner
Films directed by Ron Howard
Films scored by Hans Zimmer
Films set in 1970
Films set in 1975
Films set in 1976
Films set in Austria
Films set in Brazil
Films set in Emilia-Romagna
Films set in England
Films set in Italy
Films set in Japan
Films set in London
Films set in New York (state)
Films set in the Netherlands
Films set in South Africa
Films set in Spain
Films set in Vienna
Films set in West Germany
Films shot in Austria
Films shot in Cologne
Films shot in England
Films shot in Hampshire
Films shot in Kent
Films shot in Lincolnshire
Films shot in Norfolk
Formula One mass media
German auto racing films
2010s German-language films
German nonlinear narrative films
Imagine Entertainment films
Niki Lauda
Sports films based on actual events
Universal Pictures films
Working Title Films films
2010s English-language films
2010s American films
2010s British films
2010s German films